Gaines-Burgers is an American brand of dog food currently owned and marketed by dVour Brands Corporation. Gaines-Burgers had been originally introduced in 1961 by General Foods, which ceased its production 1990s. The product consists of individually wrapped patties of moisturized dog food that resembled a hamburger.

History 
Gaines-Burgers was named after the former Gaines Food Company of Sherburne, New York, a major pet food company acquired by General Foods in 1943.  In November 1982, General Foods introduced "Improved Gaines-Burgers Cheese", advertised as made with cheddar cheese. The "improved" reference relates to an earlier version of the product "with cheese" marketed in the early 1970s.

In 1984, General Foods sold Gaines to Anderson, Clayton and Company. In 1986, Quaker Oats Company bought Anderson, Clayton to acquire Gaines for its pet food division; Quaker sold the remainder of Anderson, Clayton to Kraft.

In 2019, dVour Brands Corporation, a company based in Chicago, filled to register rights to the Gaines-Burgers brand. Limited edition premium brand offerings of small batch fresh, slow cooked USDA-approved meat protein patties form were offered in 2020. The product was made available for consumers in limited batches in February 2020.

Trivia 

In 1972, National Lampoon'''s Deteriorata (a spoof of Desiderata, then enjoying a measure of popular attention thanks to a spoken word recording) singled out Gaines-Burgers "with cheese" in order to poke fun at modern product advertising using the line "Take heart amid the deepening gloom that your dog is finally getting enough cheese".''

Footnotes 

Dog food brands
General Foods